The canton of L'Aigle is an administrative division of the Orne department, northwestern France. It was created at the French canton reorganisation which came into effect in March 2015. Its seat is in L'Aigle.

Political representation

General councillors from 1833 to 1982

Departmental councillors since 2015

Composition

Composition prior to 1982

Composition since 2015 
The canton of L'Aigle is composed of seven communes in their entirety.

References

Cantons of Orne